Eyüboğlu High School is a private high school located in Istanbul. It was founded in 1970 by Dr.Rüstem Eyüboğlu.

External links
Eyüboğlu Educational Institutes

High schools in Istanbul
International Baccalaureate schools in Turkey
Educational institutions established in 1970
1970 establishments in Turkey